Santa Cruz is a corregimiento in Renacimiento District, Chiriquí Province, Panama. Its population as of 1990 was 2,859; its population as of 2000 was 2,785.

References

Corregimientos of Chiriquí Province